Paula Hermida Velo (born 24 October 1977) is a Spanish former professional tennis player.

Biography
Hermida comes from the Galician city of Ferrol and was coached by her father. She won the Spanish Junior Championships as an 11-year old in 1988.

As a professional she won 10 ITF singles titles, reaching a best ranking of 148 in the world. She featured in the main draw of the Birmingham Classic WTA Tour tournament in 1996 and during her career played in the qualifying event at all four grand slams.

Retiring from professional tennis in 2001, Hermida went on to compete in the sport of padel tennis.

ITF finals

Singles (10–6)

Doubles (5–4)

References

External links
 
 

1977 births
Living people
Spanish female tennis players
Sportspeople from Galicia (Spain)
Sportspeople from Ferrol, Spain